R. R. Sekaran was elected to the Tamil Nadu Legislative Assembly from the Omalur constituency in the 1996 elections. He won with 41523 votes. He was a candidate of the Tamil Maanila Congress (TMC) party.

References 

Tamil Nadu MLAs 1996–2001
Tamil Maanila Congress politicians
Possibly living people
Year of birth missing
Tamil Nadu politicians